The fourth season of Beverly Hills, 90210, an American teen drama television series aired from September 8, 1993 on Fox and concluded on May 25, 1994 after 32 episodes. The season aired Wednesday nights at 8/9c in the United States averaging 21.1 million viewers a week and was released on DVD in 2008.

This is the final season for Shannen Doherty, who would return as Brenda in the 2008 revival series 90210, and the first season for Mark Damon Espinoza (Jesse) and Kathleen Robertson (Clare).

Overview
This season follows the gang during their freshman year of college at California University which is full of surprises as they struggle with issues such as sex, teen pregnancy, date rape, drug abuse, animal rights, politics, relationships, antisemitism, marriage, infidelity, crime, abortion, and homophobia. Despite the fact that the gang has begun college, the former West Bev students' lives are seriously heating up. Andrea rejects Yale and meets someone who will change her life forever.  Brandon sees a future in politics. Brenda resolves to return home to Minnesota, feeling it's time for a fresh start. When unresolved feelings from the past reemerge, Kelly and Dylan's relationship is put to the test. Donna becomes divided between her family's religion and her feelings for David. When the strains of college begin to rise, David begins to experiment with a little pick-me-up that does more harm than good in his life. Steve's freewheeling hooking up habits finally catch up with him.

Cast

Starring
Jason Priestley as Brandon Walsh  
Shannen Doherty as Brenda Walsh  
Jennie Garth as Kelly Taylor  
Ian Ziering as Steve Sanders  
Gabrielle Carteris as Andrea Zuckerman-Vasquez 
Luke Perry as Dylan McKay  
Brian Austin Green as David Silver  
Tori Spelling as Donna Martin  
Carol Potter as Cindy Walsh  
James Eckhouse as Jim Walsh

Recurring

Episodes

Home media
The DVD release of season four was released in Regions 1, 2 and 4. This season is currently available to stream via CBS Access, however, episodes 15 and 32 are missing due to copyright permissions.

References

1993 American television seasons
1994 American television seasons
Beverly Hills, 90210 seasons